Pierphulia is a Neotropical genus of butterflies in the family Pieridae.

Species
Pierphulia isabela Field & Herrera, 1977
Pierphulia nysiella (Röber, [1909])
Pierphulia rosea (Ureta, 1956)

References

Pierini
Pieridae of South America
Pieridae genera
Taxa named by William Schaus